Peter Glover is the name of:

Peter Glover (British Army officer), British Army officer
Peter Glover (footballer), English footballer
Peter Glover (politician), American politician